The Diocese of Aire and Dax (Latin: Dioecesis Adurensis et Aquae Augustae; French: Diocèse d'Aire et Dax) is a Latin Church ecclesiastical territory or diocese of the Catholic Church in France. It comprises the département of Landes, in the région of Gascony in Aquitaine.

It was a suffragan diocese of the Archdiocese of Auch under the Ancien Régime, but was not re-established until 1822, when it was again made a suffragan of the re-established Archdiocese of Auch, and was assigned the territory of the former Diocese of Aire and Diocese of Acqs (Dax). It is now a suffragan in the ecclesiastical province of the metropolitan Archdiocese of Bordeaux.

It has been known since 1857 as the Diocese of Aire and Dax. It is a co-cathedral diocese, with cathedras in the Cathedral St-Jean-Baptiste d' Aire and in Nôtre Dame de Dax.

On April 6, 2017, the resignation letter of recent Bishop Herve Gaschignard was officially accepted by Pope Francis following allegations that Gaschignard engaged in inappropriate behavior with young people.

History
The first reference to a bishop of Aire, on the river Adour, in history is to Marcellus, represented at the Council of Agde, 506. Aire was also the home of St. Philibert; it numbered among its bishops during the second half of the sixteenth century François de Foix, Count of Candale, an illustrious mathematician, who translated Euclid and founded a chair of mathematics at the University of Bordeaux, though he never visited his diocese.

In 1572, on the death of Bishop Christophe de Candale, the Capitular Vicar of Aire submitted a status report (pouillé) to King Charles IX, providing a picture of the diocese at that time. There were two Archdeacons, that of Marsan and that of Chalosse. In addition to the two archdeacons, the Cathedral Chapter was composed of ten Canons and seven Prebendaries, two semi-Prebendaries, the Master of the Children of the Choir, and the Basse-Contre. The Statutes of the Chapter were confirmed by Bishop Tristan d'Aure in 1459 or 1460.

Religious establishments included: 
the Abbaye du Mas d'Aire (O.S.B.: four religious, a Prior, a Sacristan, a Chamberlain and an Almoner; eleven other positions vacant)
the Abbaye de St-Jean de la Castelle (Premonstratensians: six religious priests, a child servant, and a soldier, though there were places for 18-20 religious and four novices) 
the Abbaye of Saint-Loubouer (Collegiate church: Abbot, eight Canons, Cantor)
the Collegiate Church of Pimbo (Abbot, seven Canons and a Cantor)
the Abbaye of Pontaut (Cistercians: Abbot, seven religious and a soldier)
the Convent of Augustine Religious at Geune.
the Priory of Mongaillard (O.S.B.)
the Commanderie of St-Antoine
the Abbaye of Saint-Sever (O.S.B.) (Abbot commendatory: Archbishop of Turin, thirteen religious, a vicar, and a soldier)
the Jacobins, or Frères Prêcheurs de Ste-Ursule (six religious)
the Priory of Nervis
the Collegial Church of Saint-Girons (Abbot and eight Canons)
the Commanderie of the Holy Spirit.
the Priory of Roquefort (O.S.B.)
the Commanderie de Bessaut
the Commanderie de St-Antoine de Gelonies
the Priory of Mont-de-Marsan (O.S.B.)
the Priory of Sen a Labrit.

The hamlet believed to be the birthplace of St. Vincent de Paul is within the limits of the present Diocese of Aire, though in his lifetime it was part of the diocese of Dax and had nothing to do with Aire. In the Gallo-Roman crypt of Mas d'Aire is preserved in a sarcophagus the body of St. Quitteria, daughter of a governor of Gallicia, and martyred, perhaps under Commodus, for her resolution to remain a virgin.

The city of Saint-Sever, in the Diocese of Aire. owes its origin to an ancient Benedictine abbey, built in the tenth century by a Duke of Gascony as an act of thanksgiving for a victory over the Northmen, and whose church was dedicated to St. Severus. The Gothic church of Mimizan is the only survival of a Benedictine abbey. The church of Carcarés, dating from the year 810, is one of the oldest in France.

Bishops

To 1000
506, 533 : Marcellus
585 : Rusticus
614 : Palladius
ca. 620–630 : Philibaud
ca. 633–675 : Ursus
ca. 788 : Asinarius
ca. 977 : Gombaud

1000 to 1300

ca. 1017 : Arsius-Racca
1060 : Raymond le Vieux
1060–1092 : Peter I.
1092–1099 : Peter II.
1100–1115 : Wilhelm
1116–1147 : Bonhomme
1148–ca. 1176 : Vital de Saint-Hermes
ca. 1176–1179 : Odon d’Arbéchan
 ? : Bertrand de Marsan
 ? : Guillaume Bernard
1211 : Vital de Beufmort
1211 : Jourdain
 ? : Gauthier
1224–1237 : Auger
1237–1266 : Pierre III. et Raymond de Saint-Martin
1266–1295 : Pierre IV. de Betous
1295–1307 : Martin

1300–1500

1308–January 1326 : Bernard de Bats
1326–1327 : Anesanche de Toujouse
1327–1349 : Garsias de Fau
1349 – 15 November 1354 : Dauphin de Marquefave
1354 : Bernard
1361–end May 1386 : Jean de Montaut
4 June 1386 – 1390 : Robert Waldeby, O.E.S.A. (nominated by Urban VI of the Roman Obedience)
14 November 1390 – 1393 : Maurice Usk, O.P. (appointed by Boniface IX of the Roman Obedience) 
1393–1418 : Arnaud-Guillaume de Lescun (appointed by Boniface IX of the Roman Obedience)
1386–1397 : Garsias-Arnaud de Navailles (appointed by Avignon Pope Clement VII)
1397–1418 : Bernard de Brun, O.P. (appointed by Benedict XIII of the Avignon Obedience)
1423–1440 : Roger de Castelbon (appointed by Martin V)
1440–1445 : Pierre de Gachefret
16 January 1445 to 30 July 1460 : Louis d'Albret (Administrator, 1445–1449; then Bishop)
1460–1475 : Tristan d'Aure (Bishop of Couserans, 1444–1460) 
1475–1484 : Pierre de Foix
1484–1485 : Mathieu de Nargassie 
15 February 1486 – 1512 : Bernard d'Abbadie

1500 to 1800

1512–1516 : Antoine du Monastey
1516 – 22 December 1521 : Arnaud-Guillaume d’Aydie
24 April 1523 – 1530 : Charles de Gramont 
9 March 1530 – 6 February 1538 : Gabriel de Saluces
1538–1560 : Jacques de Saint-Julien
1560–4 September 1570 : Christophe de Foix-Candale 
1576–5 February 1594 : François de Foix-Candale (never consecrated)
 Vacant 
4 December 1606 – 1621 : Philippe Cospéan 
1621 – 17 January 1625 : Sébastien Bouthilier 
1625–1649 : Gilles Boutault
1650–1657 : Charles-François de Bourlemont 
1657 – 12 October 1672 - Bernard de Sariac 
12 January 1673 – 18 December 1684 : Jean-Louis de Fromentières
1693 – 29 March 1698 : Armand Bazin de Bezons 
1698–1706 : Louis-Gaston Fleuriau d’Armenonville
1706 – 30 June 1710 : François-Gaspard de la Mer de Matha
1710–1723 : Joseph-Gaspard de Montmorin de Saint-Hérem
1723–1734 : Gilbert de Montmorin de Saint-Hérem
1735–1757 : François de Sarret de Gaujac
1758–1783 : Playcard (or Playcourt) de Raigecourt
1783–1801 : Sébastien-Charles-Philibert de Cahuzac de Caux

From 1800 — Bishops of Aire and Dax

1823–1827 : Jean-François-Marie Le Pappe de Trévern (also Archbishop of Strasbourg)
1827–1839 : Dominique-Marie Savy 
1839 – 30 June 1856 : François-Adélaïde-Adolphe Lanneluc
15 December 1856 – 6 June 1859 : Prosper-Michel-Armand Hiraboure
26 September 1859 – 23 July 1876 : Louis-Marie-Olivier Épivent
18 December 1876 – 7 August 1905 : Victor-Jean-Baptiste-Paulin Delannoy
21 February 1906 – 1911 : François Touzet
1911–1930 : Maurice Charles Alfred de Cormont
1930–1963 : Clément Mathieu
1963–1978 : Fernand Pierre Robert Bézac des Martinies
1978–2002 : Robert Pierre Sarrabère
2002–2012 : Philippe Breton
2012–2017 : Hervé Gaschignard (fr)
2017–present: Nicolas Jean-Marie Souchu

See also
Catholic Church in France
List of Catholic dioceses in France

References

Sources

Reference Works
 p. 72. (in Latin)
 p. 80.

Studies

 Instrumenta, pp. 181–185.

External links
  Centre national des Archives de l'Église de France, L’Épiscopat francais depuis 1919, retrieved: 2016-12-24.
Cheney, David M., Catholic-Hierarchy:  Diocese of Aire et Dax. Retrieved: 2016-08-05 

Aire
Aire
Aire
1822 establishments in France